Éxitos y Más is a greatest hits album by Monchy y Alexandra. The album consists of songs from all of their albums including three new songs: "No Es Una Novela", "Corazón Prendido", and "Te Regalo". The album was released on DualDisc.

Track listing

Charts

Weekly charts

Year-end charts

See also
List of number-one Billboard Tropical Albums from the 2000s

References

Monchy & Alexandra compilation albums
2006 greatest hits albums
Spanish-language compilation albums